John Rhosos or Rhosus (active 1447–1497, d. Feb. 1498) was a Greek Cretan scribe and calligrapher who lived and worked in 15th century Renaissance Italy. He copied and translated works of Classical literature in Venice, Florence, Rome and other cities of Italy. He worked for Bessarion and is considered by some to be one of the most important Greek copyists of the Renaissance.

Known works
Homer's Odyssey – transcription
 Minuscule 448

See also
Greek scholars in the Renaissance

References

Further reading 
 Bernard de Montfaucon, [http://gallica.bnf.fr/ark:/12148/bpt6k1041709q Palaeographia Graeca] (Paris, 1708), pp. 81-86.
 Ambroise Firmin-Didot, Alde Manuce et L’hellénisme a Venise (Paris, 1875), p. 468.

People from Crete
Greek Renaissance humanists
Medieval European scribes
Greek scribes
15th-century Greek people
15th-century Italian people
Translators from Greek
15th-century Greek writers